A Plexus is a network of nerves or blood vessels.

Plexus may also refer to:

Science and medicine
Nervous plexus, a branching network of intersecting nerves
Choroid plexus, a network of cells that produces the cerebrospinal fluid in the ventricles of the brain
Venous plexus, a congregation of multiple veins
Cardiac plexus, a congregation of nerves situated at the base of the heart that innervates the heart
Celiac plexus, a complex network of nerves located in the abdomen
Plexus ricei, an extinct Ediacaran organism

Other uses
 Plexus, a 1953 novel by Henry Miller, part of The Rosy Crucifixion trilogy
 Plexus Consulting Group, a management consulting firm to non-profit and public service sectors
 Plexus Publishing, an imprint of Information Today, Inc.
 The Plexus Rangers, characters in the comic book series American Flagg!